Neil McDougall Turner (10 October 1891 – January 1971) was a Scottish footballer who played in the English Football League, Scottish Football League and the American Soccer League as a forward.

Career
Born in Glasgow, Scotland, Turner played for Petershill as a youth player. In September 1913, he moved to Leeds City. In August 1914, Leeds sent Turner to Raith Rovers. During World War I, he played as a guest with Benburb F.C. At some point, he joined Vale of Leven before moving to Kilmarnock in September 1918. He also played for Aberdare Athletic and Sunderland.

In October 1923, Turner joined Bethlehem Steel of the American Soccer League. In 1925, he moved to the New Bedford Whalers before finishing his career with the Springfield Babes during the 1926–1927 season.

References

External links
 

1891 births
1971 deaths
Date of death unknown
Scottish footballers
Footballers from Glasgow
People from Govan
Association football outside forwards
Scottish Football League players
Scottish Junior Football Association players
English Football League players
Petershill F.C. players
Leeds City F.C. players
Raith Rovers F.C. players
Benburb F.C. players
St Mirren F.C. players
Vale of Leven F.C. players
Kilmarnock F.C. players
Sunderland A.F.C. players
Aberdare Athletic F.C. players
Dundee F.C. players
Scottish emigrants to the United States
Bethlehem Steel F.C. (1907–1930) players
New Bedford Whalers players
Springfield Babes players
American Soccer League (1921–1933) players
Scottish expatriate footballers
Scottish expatriate sportspeople in the United States
Expatriate soccer players in the United States